White Wind is the ninth extended play by South Korean girl group Mamamoo. It was released by RBW on March 14, 2019 and distributed by Kakao M. It contains seven songs, including its lead single "Gogobebe". The EP is the fourth and final album under the 4 Seasons, 4 Colors project.

Background and release 

On January 4, 2018, Mamamoo released the digital single "Paint Me" and introduced the project 4 Seasons, 4 Colors. The group planned on releasing four EPs within the following year, with each  EP being representative of a season and a member of Mamamoo. The member in focus will be featured in a solo track on the respective EPs, along with having a personal color assigned to represent themselves. The first installment of the project, Yellow Flower, was released on March 8, 2018, followed up by the EPs Red Moon on June 16 and Blue;s on November 29 respectively.

On February 28, 2019, the EP and its title were announced through Mamamoo's official Twitter account, along with the planned promotional roll-out.  The EP focuses on member Wheein, who chose white as her color, the represented season is Winter. On March 14, the EP was released to various physical and digital retailers, as well as streaming platforms. Lead single Gogobebe and a correlating music video were released on the same day. A music video for Wheein's solo track 25 was released on May 25.

Track listing

Charts

Album

Weekly charts

Monthly charts

Year-end charts

"Gogobebe"

Weekly charts

Year-end charts

Accolades

References

2019 EPs
Mamamoo EPs
Korean-language EPs
Kakao M EPs